Portrait of Pauline Hübner is an oil on canvas portrait by Julius Hübner of his new wife, Pauline Charlotte (née Bendemann). He produced it just after their marriage in 1829 and it is held to belong to the Düsseldorf school of painting. It is now in the Alte Nationalgalerie in Berlin.

References

Hubner, Pauline
1829 paintings
Paintings in the collection of the Alte Nationalgalerie
Hubner, Pauline
Portraits by German artists
Dogs in art